Isla Picton Airport,  is an airport  north of Quinta de Tilcoco, a town in the O'Higgins Region of Chile.

There are hills nearby east and west, and high terrain to the north.

See also

Transport in Chile
List of airports in Chile

References

External links
OpenStreetMap - Isla Picton
OurAirports - Isla Picton
FallingRain - Isla Picton Airport

Airports in O'Higgins Region